Salvatierra may refer to:

Places
Mexico
 Salvatierra, Guanajuato, a municipality in the state of Guanajuato
Spain
 Salvatierra (comarca), a subcomarca of Guijuelo in the province of Salamanca, Castile and León
 Berrocal de Salvatierra, a municipality in the province of Salamanca, Castile and León
 Fuenterroble de Salvatierra, a municipality in the province of Salamanca, Castile and León
 Salvatierra/Agurain, a municipality in the province of Álava, Basque Country
 Salvatierra de Esca, a municipality in the province of Zaragoza, Aragon
 Salvatierra de los Barros, a municipality in the province of Badajoz, Extremadura
 Salvatierra de Santiago, a municipality in the province of Cáceres, Extremadura

People with the surname
 Adriana Salvatierra (born 1989), Bolivian political scientist and politician
 Agustín Salvatierra (born 1970), Chilean footballer
 Daniel Salvatierra (born 1990), Argentine footballer
 Diego Salvatierra (born 1980), Argentine footballer
 Herbert Salvatierra (born 1980), Bolivian lawyer and politician
 José Salvatierra (born 1989) Costa Rican footballer
 Juan María de Salvatierra (1648–1717), Catholic missionary
 Raul Salvatierra (born 1991), Bolivian basketball player
 Roberto Salvatierra (born 1984), Argentine footballer

Spanish-language surnames